Parhomaloptera microstoma is a species of balitorid or gastromyzontid loach endemic to the island of Borneo. It is the only member of its genus. It lives in fast-flowing streams and grows to  TL.

References

Gastromyzontidae
Monotypic fish genera
Endemic fauna of Borneo
Fauna of Brunei
Freshwater fish of Indonesia
Freshwater fish of East Malaysia
Taxa named by George Albert Boulenger
Fish described in 1899
Freshwater fish of Borneo